Stanley Logan (born Stanley William Maurice Logan; 12 June 1885 – 30 January 1953) was an English actor, screen writer, theatre director and film director.

Biography
Stanley Logan was born on 12 June 1885 in Earlsfield, Greater London, England as Stanley William Maurice Logan. He died on 30 January 1953 in New York City.

During his life, Logan was married twice: first with Alice E. Hirst and later to vaudeville stage actress Odette Myrtil.

Filmography

References

External links

Stanley Logan in the University of Bristol Theatre collection;
;

English male film actors
English male screenwriters
English theatre directors
1885 births
1953 deaths
Male actors from London
Writers from London
Film directors from London
People from Earlsfield
20th-century English male actors
20th-century English screenwriters
20th-century English male writers